Nicolás Rodríguez may refer to:

Nicolás Rodríguez (actor), Mexican film actor
Nicolás Rodríguez (sailor) (born 1991), Spanish sailor
Nicolás Rodríguez Carrasco (1890-1940), Mexican general
Nicolás Rodríguez Peña (1775-1853), Argentine politician
Nicolás Rodríguez (footballer, born 1991), Uruguayan football right-back
Nicolás Rodríguez (footballer, born 1993), Argentine football goalkeeper